Karlo Vragović (born May 13, 1989) is a Croatian professional basketball point guard who currently plays for Steaua București of Liga Națională.

External links
 Karlo Vragović profile at eurobasket.com
 Karlo Vragović profile at DraftExpress

References

Living people
1989 births
Basketball players from Zagreb
Bursaspor Basketbol players
Croatian men's basketball players
HKK Široki players
KK Cibona players
KK Zadar players
Point guards
KK Rabotnički players
Asseco Gdynia players
KK Cedevita Junior players